John Clark (January 18, 1933 in New Jersey – September 9, 2011 in St. Augustine, Florida) was an American actor who had minor roles in mainly western films.

He made an appearance in "The Silence" episode of Twilight Zone as a club member alongside Franchot Tone, Liam Sullivan, and Jonathan Harris which was broadcast on CBS on 28 April 1961.

Clark appeared in Battle of the Bulge in 1965 and had an extensive run in Spaghetti Westerns of the late 1960s and early 1970s. In 1968 he had a minor role as Hockett in the British western film of that year, Shalako, starring Sean Connery and Brigitte Bardot. In 1970, Clark had a role as a prison captain in John Guillermin's Spaghetti Western picture El Condor. The film, like most of his other films of this period, was shot on location in Almería, Spain. Other Western film credits include A Town Called Hell, Cannon for Cordoba, Captain Apache,Catlow,  Custer of the West, Four Rode Out, and The Desperados.

References

External links

1933 births
2011 deaths
Male actors from New Jersey
American male film actors
Male Spaghetti Western actors